The Huntingdon Hawks football team represents Huntingdon College in the sport of American football. The team plays at Charles Lee Field at Samford Stadium in Montgomery, Alabama. The Huntingdon Hawks compete in Division III of National Collegiate Athletic Association (NCAA). They compete in the USA South Athletic Conference and have won three conference championships in 2015, 2016, and 2017. The Hawks are currently coached by Mike Turk, who has served as the team's head football coach since 2004.

Conference affiliations
 NCAA Division III independent (2003–2007)
 St. Louis Intercollegiate Athletic Conference (2008)
 NCAA Division III independent (2009–2012)
 USA South Athletic Conference (2013–present)

Head coaching history
Huntingdon has only had two head coaches in their brief 17-year history. The Hawks first head football coach was Duane Trogdon, who served as in the position for Huntingdon's first season in 2003 leading the team to their only winless season to date with a record of 0–7. In 2004 Huntingdon College hired then-Troy assistant coach and former Troy quarterback Mike Turk as their new head football coach. Turk has served as head coach for 16 years leading the Hawks to a record of 104–48 as of September 9, 2019.

Yearly records

Playoff appearances

NCAA Division III
The Hawks have appeared in the Division III playoffs six times, with an overall record of 2–6.

Rivalries

Birmingham–Southern Panthers
The Wesley Cup is the annually game between the Huntingdon Hawks and the Birmingham–Southern Panthers. Starting in the 2009 season these two teams have played every year for the "Wesley Cup" trophy typically in the month of September. The game is named after John Wesley, the founder of the Methodist church, both, schools are private United Methodist Colleges. Birmingham-Southern leads the series 5–4.

Faulkner Eagles
The Bible Bowl was a game played between Huntingdon and Faulkner. Both colleges are private Christian colleges located in Montgomery, Alabama. The series was played from 2007 through 2011 with Huntingdon winning all five meetings between the two schools to date. The series ended with the 2011 game being the last between the two schools for now. With Huntingdon looking to play more Division III opponents to better position themselves for playoffs. Along with the Faulkner playing football in the National Association of Intercollegiate Athletics (NAIA) a completely separate organization of college athletics than the NCAA. With their conference the Mid-South Conference requiring them to schedule 10 of their potential 10–11 games as conference opponents. Thus reducing the opportunity for the two schools scheduling each other.

Maryville Scots
The Maryville Scots of Maryville, Tennessee and the Huntingdon Hawks have been annual foes since their first meeting in the 2004 season and have only missed one season playing each other, 2006. Huntingdon leads the all-time series versus Maryville 11–3 and won 10 straight from 2008 to 2017.

LaGrange Panthers
Huntingdon and LaGrange have been a fixture on each other's schedules since the 2006 season. Both Schools are private United Methodist colleges. Since 2006, the two schools have met a total of 13 times with Huntingdon dominating the series 10–3 and winning the most recent matchup 42–14 on November 11, 2018.

References

 
American football teams established in 2003
2003 establishments in Alabama